Kraussia floribunda is a species of plant in the family Rubiaceae. It ranges from Mozambique and Eswatini to eastern South Africa, and is associated with the Tongoland-Pondoland regional mosaic. The type was described from a plant collected by Dr. F. Krauss near Durban.

References

External links
Tongaland-Pondoland Regional Mosaic

floribunda